División de Honor de Béisbol 2015 is the 30th season since its establishment. 2015 season started on 28 March and finished on 12 July.

After the resign to play in the top league of El Llano BC, only eight teams played the Spanish baseball top league and there were not any relegations to Primera División. Tenerife Marlins re-conquered the title.

League table

Source:

References

External links
Spanish Baseball and Softball Federation website

División de Honor de Béisbol